Parataeniophorus is a genus of flabby whalefishes that was formerly included in the no longer recognized tapetail family Mirapinnidae.

Species
There are currently three recognized species in this genus:
 Parataeniophorus bertelseni Shiganova, 1989
 Parataeniophorus brevis Bertelsen & N. B. Marshall, 1956 (Short tapetail)
 Parataeniophorus gulosus Bertelsen & N. B. Marshall, 1956

References

Cetomimidae